The Social Patriotic Movement «Power» (Derzhava; ; Sotsial-patrioticheskoye dvizheniye «Derzhava») was a Russian populist, nationalist party founded by Alexander Rutskoy. It was originally created as a faction in the State Duma in the summer of 1994 by six members of the Liberal Democratic Party of Russia.

References

1994 establishments in Russia
1999 disestablishments in Russia
Conservative parties in Russia
Defunct conservative parties
Defunct nationalist parties in Russia
Pan-Slavism
Political parties disestablished in 1999
Political parties established in 1994
Right-wing parties in Europe
Right-wing populism in Russia
Right-wing populist parties
Russian nationalist parties
Social conservative parties